The Stegarake were a Manahoac people who lived along the Rappahannock and Rapidan rivers between the North Anna and Potomac rivers at the time of European contact. The Stegarake were the last remaining tribe of the Manahoac Confederacy, being last recorded in 1728.

References 

Extinct Native American tribes
Indigenous peoples of the Northeastern Woodlands